The Yarm helmet is a ca 10th-century Viking age helmet that was found in Yarm in the North Riding of Yorkshire, England. It is the first relatively complete Anglo-Scandinavian helmet found in Britain and only the second relatively complete/intact Viking helmet discovered in north-west Europe.

The helmet was discovered in the 1950s by workmen digging pipe trenches in Chapel Yard, Yarm, near the River Tees. Research led by Chris Caple of Durham University, and published in 2020, established that the helmet dates to the 10th century.

It is on display at the Preston Park Museum in Stockton-on-Tees. It is on loan from Yarm Town Council.

The iron helmet is made of bands and plates, riveted together, with a simple knop at the top. Below the brow band it has a "spectacle" guard around the eyes and nose forming a sort of mask, which suggests an affinity with earlier Vendel Period helmets. The lower edge of the brow band is pierced with circular holes, where a mail curtain (or aventail) may have been attached.

The only other near-complete Viking helmet is the Gjermundbu helmet in Norway. Other helmet remains are the Tjele helmet fragment, two fragments from Gotland, and one fragment from Kyiv.

References

Bibliography
  
 

1950s archaeological discoveries
Germanic archaeological artifacts
Individual helmets
Viking warfare
Yarm